Holy Mass Central School is a school in Edamon, Kollam, Kerala in southern India. It was founded in 2003.

For a decade and half, Holy Mass Central School is the educational light of eastern Province of Kollam dist. Holy Mass functions under the management of Holy Mass Educational Trust. The School situates on the side of N.H.744 at Edamon, Punalur Taluk of Kollam District. The school is situated in ideal place covered with landscape and calm atmosphere. The place is very close to India's first Ecotourism project Thenmala, Palaruvi waterfalls, Ambanad Hills and other beautiful sceneries giving much scope to raise the standard of the institution even to an international level The school offers classes Play Class, LKG, UKG, to Std.VIII and will upgrade to secondary and senior secondary in the coming academic year. The aim of Holy Mass Educational Trust is uplift the downtrodden section educationally, culturally. Along with the Trust undertakes the duty of imparting right knowledge and motivating right action. Holy Mass Educational Trust and its institution make the child prepare to face the competing challenges of this century. Holy Mass Central School adopts various methods with help of modern scientific and technological advancement.
The school follows the Central Board of Secondary Education curriculum from kindergarten into the upper classes. Holy Mass Central School is fourth institution under the management of Holy Mass Educational Trust.

References

Catholic schools in India
Christian schools in Kerala
Schools in Kollam district
Educational institutions established in 2003
2003 establishments in Kerala